HC Most is an ice hockey team in Most, Czech Republic. They play in the Czech 1.liga, the second level of Czech ice hockey. The club was founded in 1946.

Achievements
Czech 2.liga champion: 2004, 2007.

References

External links
Official site

Most
Ice hockey clubs established in 1951
Sport in Most (city)
1951 establishments in Czechoslovakia